The Alemannenring was an auto racing circuit in Southern Germany. The circuit was located on public roads around in the industrial area of Singen in Baden-Württemberg. It hosted its final motor race in 1995.

Circuit
The track featured eight turns, seven of which were 90-degree turns and the other a 180-degree hairpin turn. There was also a small chicaned section towards the end of the straight on Robert Gerwig Strasse. The track is similar to the Norisring, for its street profile, length and for having 8 turns.

German Touring Car Events
The circuit hosted a Deutsche Tourenwagen Meisterschaft (DTM) event annually between 1991 and 1995, the only racing the street circuit ever saw.

DTM Victories
 3 Victories:  Nicola Larini (Alfa Romeo), Bernd Schneider (Mercedes Benz)
 2 Victories:  Kurt Thiim (Mercedes Benz)
 1 Victory:    Frank Biela (Audi),  Hans-Joachim Stuck (Audi)

In 2009, a group known as Alemanni Ring eV attempted to revive the circuit to hold another DTM event. It would have been the first time the circuit held a DTM event in the series' new form as the Deutsche Tourenwagen Masters. Previously, the events had been held when the series was known as the Deutsche Tourenwagen Meisterschaft. The group encountered local governmental problems and the organisers of the DTM series decided against holding an event. The group have now disbanded but still maintain a website.

Lap records 

The official race lap records at the Alemannenring are listed as:

References

Defunct motorsport venues in Germany
Sports venues in Baden-Württemberg